Iris Rudder (born November 11, 1960) is an American politician. She serves as a Republican member of the Tennessee House of Representatives the 39th District, which accompanies Moore County along with parts of Franklin and Marion Counties. She was last elected November 6, 2018 and has been in office since then. Her term ends in 2022.

Political career 
Rudder was a past chairman of the Franklin County Republican Party from 2011-2015. She is still currently the President of the Franklin County Republican Ladies since she was given the job in 2016. She is also a founder of the Southern Tennessee Ladies Society.

In 2018, Rudder then began her campaign to become a member of the Tennessee House of Representatives. She won the Republic Primary Election for Tennessee House of Representatives District 39 on August 2, 2018. She would later go on to win the election and become a member of the Tennessee House of Representatives by defeating Sharon Adams in the General Election on November 6, 2018.

She also is a co-host of the Right Way Radio Show.

2018 Election 
Republic Primary election for Tennessee House of Representatives District 39

Rudder won the Republic Primary election on August 2, 2018.

General election for Tennessee House of Representatives District 39

Rudder won the election on November 6, 2018.

Biography 
Rudder is married with two children. Her home city is in Winchester, Tennessee. Rudder is a Christian.

Awards and honors 
 2015 Statesman of the Year for the 4th District

References 

1950 births
Living people
Republican Party members of the Tennessee House of Representatives
Women state legislators in Tennessee
21st-century American politicians
21st-century American women politicians
People from Winchester, Tennessee